Salma bint Mohammed al Kindi is an Omani chemist. She is professor of Analytical Chemistry and dean of the College of Sciences at the Sultan Qaboos University (SQU).

In 2017 she received a Lifetime Achievement in Chemistry Award from the Venus International Foundation based in Chennai.

References

Living people
Omani chemists
Women chemists
Academic staff of Sultan Qaboos University
Year of birth missing (living people)